These are the squads for the 1997 Korea Cup in South Korea, which took place from 12 to 16 June 1997. The players' listed age is their age on the tournament's opening day (12 June 1997).

Egypt
Head coach: Mahmoud Al Gohary

Ghana
Head coach: Rinus Israël

South Korea
Head coach: Cha Bum-kun

FR Yugoslavia
Head coach: Slobodan Santrač

See also
1997 Korea Cup

External links
Korea Cup 1997 at RSSSF

1997 squad